Carmen is a 1915 American silent drama film, written and directed by Raoul Walsh, which starred Theda Bara. It is based on the 1845 novella Carmen, the film was shot at the Fox Studio in Fort Lee, New Jersey. It is now considered lost.

Cast
 Theda Bara as Carmen
 Einar Linden as Don Jose
 Carl Harbaugh as Escamillo
 James A. Marcus as Dancaire
 Emil De Varney as Captain Morales
 Elsie MacLeod as Michaela
 Fay Tunis as Carlotta
 Joseph P. Green

See also
List of lost films
Carmen, surviving film adaption of Carmen also released in November 1915 directed by Cecil B. DeMille
1937 Fox vault fire

References

External links

Review from Motion Picture News, printed alongside a review for the DeMille production

1915 films
1915 drama films
1915 lost films
Fox Film films
Silent American drama films
American silent feature films
American black-and-white films
Films based on romance novels
Films based on Carmen
Films directed by Raoul Walsh
Films set in Spain
Films set in the 19th century
Films shot in Fort Lee, New Jersey
Lost American films
Lost drama films
Films about Romani people
1910s American films